Ethmia flavianella is a moth in the family Depressariidae. It is found in France, Italy, Slovenia, Albania and North Macedonia.

The larvae have been recorded feeding on Thalictrum species, including Thalictrum foetidum.

References

Moths described in 1832
flavianella
Moths of Europe